The women's 4 × 400 metres relay event at the 2007 Summer Universiade was held on 14 July.

Results

Final

References
Results

Relay
2007